Baron Dufferin and Claneboye, of Ballyleidy and Killyleagh in County Down, Northern Ireland, is a title in the Peerage of Ireland. It was created on 30 July 1800 for Dame Dorcas Blackwood, widow of Sir John Blackwood, 2nd Baronet, Member of the Irish Parliament for Killyleagh and Bangor, in return for support for the Union of Ireland and the United Kingdom.

History
The peerage had been intended for Sir John in return for his support for the Union with the Kingdom of Great Britain. The Blackwood Baronetcy, of Killyleagh in the County of Down, was created in the Baronetage of Ireland in 1763 for Robert Blackwood, the father of Sir John Blackwood. He was the son of John Blackwood and Ursula Hamilton, the daughter and co-heir of Robert Hamilton of Killyleagh, County Down. The Blackwood family, originally of Scottish descent, were prominent landowners in County Down and controlled the borough constituency of Killyleagh in the Irish Parliament. Lady Dufferin and Claneboye was the daughter of James Stevenson, son of Colonel Hans Stevenson and Anne Hamilton, daughter of James Hamilton, son of Archibald Hamilton, of Halcraig, Lanarkshire, brother of James Hamilton, 1st Viscount Claneboye. Her great-grandfather James Hamilton had become the sole heir of Lord Claneboye when the first Viscount's grandson, Henry Hamilton, 2nd Earl of Clanbrassil and 3rd Viscount Claneboye, died in 1675.

Lady Dufferin and Claneboye was succeeded by her son, the second Baron, who had already succeeded his father as third Baronet. He represented Killyleagh in the Irish House of Commons and Helston and Aldeburgh in the British House of Commons and was also an Irish Representative Peer from 1820 to 1836. He was childless and was succeeded by his younger brother, the third Baron. The latter's grandson, the fifth Baron, was a prominent Liberal politician, diplomat and colonial administrator, and notably served as Governor General of Canada and Viceroy of India. In 1850, at the age of 23, he was created Baron Clandeboye, of Clandeboye in the County of Down, in the Peerage of the United Kingdom, which gave him a seat in the House of Lords. In 1871 he was created Viscount Clandeboye, of Clandeboye in the County of Down, and Earl of Dufferin, in the County of Down, and in 1888 he was even further honoured when he was made Earl of Ava, in the Province of Burma, and Marquess of Dufferin and Ava, in the County of Down and in the Province of Burma. These titles were also in the Peerage of the United Kingdom. Lord Dufferin and Ava also assumed by Royal licence the additional surname of Hamilton in 1862 and that of Temple (which was the maiden name of his father's mother) in 1872.

His eldest son and heir apparent Archibald Hamilton-Temple-Blackwood, Earl of Ava, was killed at the Siege of Ladysmith during the Second Boer War while serving as a war correspondent. He was unmarried and the Marquess was therefore succeeded by the second son, the second Marquess. On his death, the titles passed to another brother, the third Marquess. He was a soldier and also served as Speaker of the Senate of Northern Ireland. Lord Dufferin and Ava died in an air crash and he was succeeded by his son, the fourth Marquess. He notably held office as Under-Secretary of State for the Colonies in the government of Neville Chamberlain.

After his death in the Second World War, the titles were inherited by his six-year-old son, the fifth Marquess, later a well-known patron of arts. He was childless and on his death in 1988 the marquessate, earldoms, viscountcy and barony of Clandeboye (created in 1850) became extinct. His widow, Lindy, Marchioness of Dufferin and Ava lived at the Clandeboye Estate until her death on 26 October 2020.

The last Marquess was succeeded in the baronetcy and barony of Dufferin and Claneboye by his distant relative Sir Francis George Blackwood, 7th Baronet, of the Navy (see below), who became the tenth Baron. Since 1991, the titles have been held by the latter's son, the eleventh Baron. Like his father he lives in Australia.

The Blackwood Baronetcy, of the Navy, was created in the Baronetage of the United Kingdom in 1814 for the Honourable Henry Blackwood, seventh son of Sir John Blackwood, 2nd Baronet and of Dorcas Blackwood, 1st Baroness Dufferin and Claneboye. He was a Vice-Admiral of the Blue in the Royal Navy and was the bearer of despatches announcing the victory of Trafalgar in 1805. As mentioned above his descendant the seventh Baronet succeeded as tenth Baron Dufferin and Claneboye and eleventh Baronet of Killyleagh in 1988.

Holders

Blackwood Baronets, of Killyleagh (1763)
Sir Robert Blackwood, 1st Baronet (1694–1774)
Sir John Blackwood, 2nd Baronet (died 1799)
Sir James Stevenson Blackwood, 3rd Baronet (1755–1836) (succeeded as Baron Dufferin and Claneboye in 1807)

Barons Dufferin and Claneboye (1800)
Dorcas Blackwood, 1st Baroness Dufferin and Claneboye (1726–1807)
James Stevenson Blackwood, 2nd Baron Dufferin and Claneboye (1755–1836)
Hans Blackwood, 3rd Baron Dufferin and Claneboye (1758–1839)
Price Blackwood, 4th Baron Dufferin and Claneboye (1794–1841)
Frederick Temple Hamilton-Temple-Blackwood, 5th Baron Dufferin and Claneboye (1826–1902) (created Earl of Dufferin in 1871 and Marquess of Dufferin and Ava in 1888)

Marquesses of Dufferin and Ava (1888)
Frederick Temple Hamilton-Temple-Blackwood, 1st Marquess of Dufferin and Ava (1826–1902)
Terence John Temple Hamilton-Temple-Blackwood, 2nd Marquess of Dufferin and Ava (1866–1918)
Frederick Temple Hamilton-Temple-Blackwood, 3rd Marquess of Dufferin and Ava (1875–1930)
Basil Sheridan Hamilton-Temple-Blackwood, 4th Marquess of Dufferin and Ava (1909–1945)
Sheridan Frederick Terence Hamilton-Temple-Blackwood, 5th Marquess of Dufferin and Ava (1938–1988)

Barons Dufferin and Claneboye (1800; Reverted)
Francis George Blackwood, 10th Baron Dufferin and Claneboye (1916–1991)
John Francis Blackwood, 11th Baron Dufferin and Claneboye (b. 1944)

The heir apparent is the present holder's son the Hon. Francis Senden Blackwood (b. 1979)

Blackwood Baronets, of the Navy (1814)

Sir Henry Blackwood, 1st Baronet (1770–1832)
Sir Henry Martin Blackwood, 2nd Baronet (1801–1851)
Sir Henry Blackwood, 3rd Baronet (1828–1894)
Sir Francis Blackwood, 4th Baronet (1838–1924)
Sir Henry Palmer Temple Blackwood, 5th Baronet (1896–1948)
Sir Francis Elliot Temple Blackwood, 6th Baronet (1901–1979)
Sir Francis George Blackwood, 7th Baronet (1916–1991) (succeeded as 10th Baron Dufferin and Claneboye in 1988)
For further Baronets of the Navy, see above

Family Tree

See also
Dufferin (barony)
Earl of Clanbrassil

Notes

References

Attribution

Baronies in the Peerage of Ireland
1763 establishments in Ireland
Noble titles created in 1800
Dufferin
Clandeboye
Extinct marquessates in the Peerage of the United Kingdom